Tropheops lucerna is a species of cichlid endemic to Lake Malawi where it is found at depths of from  in beds of Vallisneria in bays.  This species can reach a length of  TL.  It can also be found in the aquarium trade. It feeds by brushing loose strands of algae off of rocks, sand and the leaves of macrophytes.

References

lucerna
Fish described in 1935
Taxa named by Ethelwynn Trewavas
Taxonomy articles created by Polbot
Taxobox binomials not recognized by IUCN